Sirojiddin Muhriddin, born Sirojiddin Muhriddinovich Aslov is the Minister of Foreign Affairs of Tajikistan since 2013. Muhriddin previously worked as a Permanent Representative of the Republic of Tajikistan to the United Nations from 2006 to 2013.

Biography

Muhriddin graduated with an engineering degree in 1986 from Odessa Hydro-Meteorological Institute in Ukraine. Muhriddin continued his studies by receiving an additional degree in International Economic Relations from the Tashkent State University of Economics. In the early stages of Muhriddin's career, he had published several research papers based on the Aral Sea. In the early 2000s, he made a transition into the Ministry of Foreign Affairs, where he was first appointed as a deputy minister. While being the Deputy Minister of Foreign Affairs, he was also Chairman of the Executive Committee for Saving the Aral Sea and the National Coordinator for Shanghai Cooperation Organization (SCO) Affairs. After a year as serving Deputy, Muhriddin was appointed as the Permanent Representative of Tajikistan to the United Nations as well as the non-resident ambassador to Cuba. After seven years of work within the United Nations he became the Minister of Foreign Affairs of Tajikistan in 2013.

Awards 

 Order of Glory (Tajikistan) (2010)
 Order of Friendship (Russia) (2017)
 Order "Fidokorona khizmatlari uchun" (2018)

Personal life
He is married, with five children, and speaks Persian, English, Uzbek and Russian.

See also
List of foreign ministers in 2017
List of current foreign ministers

References

Notes 

  

Tajikistani diplomats
Living people
Permanent Representatives of Tajikistan to the United Nations
1964 births
Foreign ministers of Tajikistan
Government ministers of Tajikistan